Joel Luphahla (born 26 April 1977) is a Zimbabwean football midfielder.

Luphahla was born in Tjolotjo Matebeleland province

Career
Luphahla is a Zimbabwean midfielder who has spent most of his career playing in South Africa's Premier Soccer League and also had a spell in Cyprus. He suffered a serious leg injury while playing for Platinum Stars, but returned to the club after an extended absence.

Luphahla has been capped for the Zimbabwean national team. He played for the team that won the 2000 COSAFA Cup, and was in the Zimbabwean squad for the 2006 African Cup of Nations. He plays attacking midfielder.

International goals
Scores and results list Zimbabwe's goal tally first.

Clubs
1998–2000:  Highlanders FC
2000–2004:  AEP Paphos FC
2004–2005:  Silver Stars
2005–2006:  Supersport United
2006–2010:  Platinum Stars
2010–2015:  Highlanders FC
2015-2016:  Tsholotsho FC

Presently coaching a Zimbabwean football team named Telone fc

References

External links

1977 births
Living people
Zimbabwean footballers
AEP Paphos FC players
Platinum Stars F.C. players
SuperSport United F.C. players
Cypriot First Division players
Expatriate footballers in Cyprus
Expatriate soccer players in South Africa
Zimbabwe international footballers
Zimbabwean expatriate sportspeople in South Africa
Zimbabwean expatriate footballers
2004 African Cup of Nations players
2006 Africa Cup of Nations players
Highlanders F.C. players
Association football midfielders